Halafaleh (also Romanized as Ḩalafaleh) is a village in Dasht Rural District, Silvaneh District, Urmia County, West Azerbaijan Province, Iran. At the 2006 census, its population was 69, in 12 families.

References 

Populated places in Urmia County